Gerald James Ellott  is a New Zealand architect and philatelist who signed the Roll of Distinguished Philatelists in 1988. He is a past president of the Royal Philatelic Society of New Zealand, and a member of the Royal Institute of British Architects.

In the 2008 Queen's Birthday Honours, Ellott was appointed a Member of the New Zealand Order of Merit, for services to philately. Ellott has been awarded the Fédération Internationale de Philatélie Research Medal.

Publications
The Michael Sullivan Correspondence 1874 & 1882 to 1885. Forces Postal History Society and Society of Postal Historians, 2007.

References

External links
 Ellott's postal history website

New Zealand philatelists
Signatories to the Roll of Distinguished Philatelists
Living people
Year of birth missing (living people)
Fellows of the Royal Philatelic Society London
New Zealand architects
Members of the New Zealand Order of Merit